Orca is a New Zealand company that makes wetsuits and sports apparel, primarily for triathletes.

History 
The company was founded in Auckland in 1994 by Scott Unsworth, a former New Zealand age group triathlon champion. He decided to start manufacturing wetsuits after discovering that traditional wetsuits were not suitable for swimming. In Auckland Unsworth founded a company called Performance Speedsuits Ltd.,  that manufactured swimming-friendly speed suits, and these speed suits gained much popularity. It was eventually renamed "Orca".

In 2008 the company agreed a global distribution deal with Spanish cycling giant Orbea.

Products 
Orca specialises in high range wetsuits, with most wetsuits starting at around $250 up to $700 with many of its products available worldwide. The company is recognised as a leader in introducing new technologies into triathlon. The Orca Apex 2 wetsuit uses AirLite - a world first neoprene technology. There are tiny air pockets trapped in the neoprene to provide increased buoyancy. The Orca 3.8 was the first wetsuit to feature an AirRelease panel. This is the world's first breathable neoprene, allowing heat and moisture to be transferred away from the wearer, while remaining water resistant. The all-purpose Sonar remains Orca's best selling triathlon wetsuit.

Sponsorships 
Orca sponsors a number of leading triathletes, including 2x 70.3 World Champion Sebastian Kienle, recently retired Olympic champion Hamish Carter, ITU athletes including Kris Gemmell, Courtney Atkinson, Tim Don and Debbie Tanner, and Ironman competitors including Craig Alexander and Cameron Brown. Orca also sponsors a number of national bodies including Triathlon New Zealand, Bike NZ, and the British Triathlon Federation.

In 2004 Orca was the official apparel supplier to the New Zealand Olympic team.

Notes

Clothing companies of New Zealand
Clothing companies established in 1993
Clothing brands
Swimwear brands
Swimwear manufacturers